(27 March 1910 – 19 November 1989) was a Japanese businessman and politician, mayor of Neagari, Ishikawa Prefecture, Japan, father of a former Japanese prime minister Yoshirō Mori.

During his term, he developed a relationship with the Siberian town of Shelekhov, particularly a bilateral dialogue to improve the gravesites of Soviet soldiers in Japan and Japanese soldiers in Siberia; he was so close to Russia that Japanese authorities monitored him closely as a potential communist sympathizer. He visited Shelekhov more than 15 times during his 35 years in office, and part of his ashes were buried there following his death.

References 

1910 births
1989 deaths
Japan–Soviet Union relations
Japan–Russia relations
20th-century Japanese businesspeople
Mayors of places in Japan
People from Ishikawa Prefecture
Politicians from Ishikawa Prefecture
Waseda University alumni
Parents of prime ministers of Japan